Find a Door is an album by the American folk rock musician Pete Droge (credited to Pete Droge and the Sinners), released in 1996.

Production
Recorded in Atlanta, the album was produced by Brendan O'Brien, who also produced Droge's debut; the only other returning musician was Elaine Summers. Droge and O'Brien made use of a horn section on "Wolfgang". The album art contains a photo of the Howard Finster sculpture "Bicycle Tower".

Critical reception

Entertainment Weekly opined that Droge "often sounds like a poor man’s Petty, but that’s far from the worst sin a songwriter can commit." The Los Angeles Times wrote that Droge "delivers these tales with droll understatement that accents a certain cynicism, à la John Hiatt or Randy Newman." The Indianapolis Star thought that "the tuneful Find a Door can be taken as a push to revive grass-roots rock or a testament to all that's good about it." Rolling Stone considered that "the strength of Droge's personal conviction emphasizes what is true rather than merely tried and makes Find a Door surprisingly rich and moving." The Ottawa Citizen deemed it "an unknown masterpiece," writing that "on 'Wolfgang', Droge cranks out the rollicking sort of love song that the Travelling Wilburys attempted to write, but couldn't."

AllMusic called the album "excellent," writing that "O'Brien perfectly captures the band's loose sound by putting the snare, cymbals, guitars, and Droge's voice way up at the forefront of the album's mix."

Track listing

Personnel
Pete Droge - vocals, guitar
Dave Hull - bass
Dan McCarroll - drums
Peter Stroud - guitar
Elaine Summers - vocals, percussion
Rev. Oliver Wells - piano

References

Pete Droge albums
1996 albums
American Recordings (record label) albums